Cassis cornuta, common name the horned helmet, is a species of extremely large sea snail, a marine gastropod mollusc in the family Cassidae, the helmet shells and their allies.

Description
The length of the shell varies between 50 mm and 410 mm. It is the largest of all helmet shells. It has a very solid, heavy, rotund shell with large, horn-like knobs and a wide, flat base. The shell has a dorsally pale orange colour, its base vivid orange, faintly marked with white and brown.

Habitat
This large sea snail is found on sand and coral rubble, often around reefs.

Distribution
This species occurs in the Red Sea, the Indian Ocean, off the southern African coast from northern KwaZulu-Natal and from Mozambique, as well as in the Pacific Ocean.

Relevance to humans
The shell of Cassis cornuta is a very popular collector's item. In some places the snail is hunted for meat and is traditionally roasted in the shell over fire.  Because of both of these factors, humans are a major enemy, and the species is now at risk in many places. However, worldwide it is not listed in the Red List. Because this snail hunts the crown-of-thorns starfish, which feed on corals, Cassis cornuta has been put under strict protection in Queensland.

References

 Rippingale, O.H. & McMichael, D.F., 1961. Queensland and Great Barrier Reef Shells. Jacaranda Press, Brisbane. 210 pp.
 Abbott, R.T., 1968 [31/Dec/1968]. The helmet shells of the world (Cassidae). Part 1. Indo-Pacific Mollusca, 2(9):7-198.
 Wilson, B. R. & Gillet, K., 1971. Australian Shells. A. H. & A. W. Reed, Sydney
 Salvat, B. & Rives, C., 1975. Coquillages de Polynésie. les editions du pacifique, Papeete - Tahiti. 1-391.
 Kay, E.A., 1979. Hawaiian marine shells. [Reef and shore fauna of Hawaii, Section 4: Mollusca. Bernice P. Bishop Museum Special Publication 64(4)]. Bishop Museum Press, Honolulu. xvii + 653 pp.
 Wilson, B., 1993. Australian Marine Shells. Prosobranch Gastropods. Odyssey Publishing, Kallaroo, WA.
 Kreipl, K., 1997. Recent Cassidae. Verlag Christa Hemman, Weisbaden. 1-151, pls 1-24.

External links
 
 

Cassidae
Gastropods described in 1758
Taxa named by Carl Linnaeus